Tromen is a stratovolcano in western Argentina.  It rises above the older caldera of the Volcán Negro del Tromen.

See also
 List of volcanoes in Argentina

References
 

Stratovolcanoes of Argentina
Subduction volcanoes
Mountains of Argentina
Polygenetic volcanoes
Volcanoes of Neuquén Province
Four-thousanders of the Andes